The Museum of Crime (Spanish: El museo del crimen) is a 1945 Mexican mystery film directed by René Cardona and starring David T. Bamberg, Pituka de Foronda and Ricardo Mondragón. It was one of a six-film series featuring Bamberg as Fu Manchu.

Cast 
 David T. Bamberg as Fu Manchu
 Pituka de Foronda as Margarita Palacios
 Ricardo Mondragon as Dr. Busquet
 Emma Roldán as Enfermera
 Ramón Vallarino as Manuel Ramos
 Katy Jurado as Sara Ramos
 Ángel T. Sala as Palomino
 Cuquita Escobar as Cuca
 Rafael Icardo as Belcebú
 Octavio Martinez as Dr. Andrade
 Conchita Gentil Arcos as Clementina Cardoso de Ramos
 José Morcillo as Vendedor
 Fernando Curiel as Dr. Antonio Osorio
 Carlos Villarías as Detective
 Enriqueta Reza as Sirvienta
 Ernesto Monato as Dr. Villanueva
 José Escanero as Manegador de hotel
 Humberto Rodríguez as Examinador médico

References

Bibliography 
 Cotter, Bob. The Mexican Masked Wrestler and Monster Filmography. McFarland & Company, 2005.

External links 
 

1945 films
1945 mystery films
Mexican mystery films
1940s Spanish-language films
Films directed by René Cardona

Mexican black-and-white films
1940s Mexican films
Fu Manchu films